Alice Edith Wilhelmina Pennefather (née Patterson; 1903 – 1983) was a Singaporean  badminton and tennis player. In 2016, she was inducted into the Singapore Women's Hall of Fame, maintained by the Singapore Council of Women's Organisations.

Early life
Alice Patterson was born in Singapore on 16 October 1903, and was of Japanese and Scottish descent.

Sporting career
Pennefather won the Singapore Open women's singles in 1931, 1932, 1934 and 1937. In 1931 she also won the women's doubles title, with Maude Lewis, and in 1947 and 1951 she won the mixed doubles. She was also Singapore Ladies Tennis Champion in 1936, 1937 and 1938, and the first non-European to win that title.

Pennefather played hockey for the Girls' Sports Club, captaining the team from 1931 to 1958 (except during the Japanese occupation of Singapore, 1941-1945). The Jansenites Hockey Club began at her home in Jansen Road, and celebrated its 35th anniversary with a magazine in which she was said to have been described as "Physically and character wise she was a towering person, always full of love". She was also a "leading player" of netball.

At its 50th anniversary celebrations the Girls' Sports Club (GSC) named Alice Pennefather as "The Outstanding Playing Member of the GSC". She was commonly referred to as "The Grand Old Lady of Sport".

Personal life
She married Lancelot Maurice Pennefather in 1919, when she was 16 years old; they had two sons, Percy and Ashton. Percy captained Singapore in Field hockey at the 1956 Summer Olympics and his daughter Annabel became the first woman on the Singapore National Olympic Council and first female president of the Singapore Hockey Federation.  When Annabel was awarded Her World's "Woman of the Year" in 2004 she spoke of her grandmother as "her role model for life" and "a strong sporty woman".

Alice and Lancelot celebrated their 60th wedding anniversary in 1979, at which time she was still in employment as a section head at Shaw's Rentals. Asked about the secret of a happy marriage she said "Love, tolerance and understanding", and advised any new bride to "Give in to your husband even if he's wrong or you're angry. You'll find life more pleasant." Lancelot died in 1982, and Alice on 24 February 1983.

References

External links
Photograph of Alice and Lancelot Pennefather at the GSC 50th anniversary
Genealogical information on Alice Edith Wilhelmina Patterson

1903 births
1983 deaths
Singaporean female badminton players
Singaporean female tennis players
Singaporean female field hockey players
Singaporean netball players
Singaporean people of Japanese descent
Singaporean people of Scottish descent
20th-century Singaporean women